Biaj (also Romanized as Bīāj, Bayāj, and Beyāj; also known as Beyāch) is a village in Seyyed Jamal ol Din Rural District, in the Central District of Asadabad County, Hamadan Province, Iran. At the 2006 census, its population was 118, in 26 families.

References 

Populated places in Asadabad County